Jennifer Skiff (born 1961) is an American author, journalist and television producer, best known for writing inspirational books and animal welfare diplomacy.

Early life and education
Skiff was born in Boston, Massachusetts, and raised in Bar Harbor, Maine. Growing up, her family had pet dogs, and she has said she received emotional healing from dogs. Jennifer is a graduate of Hebron Academy, a college preparatory boarding school located in Hebron, Maine. She graduated from Texas Christian University in 1983 with a double major in broadcast journalism and criminal justice.

Career

Television
Skiff began her career at WTVX-TV in Fort Pierce, Florida, and also worked as an anchor and reporter at WABI-TV in Bangor, Maine, and covered crime at KUTV in Salt Lake City, Utah. Wildlife Minutes, a television series she developed that highlighted the plight of endangered and threatened species, premiered on the Discovery Channel in 1987. She worked as an investigative correspondent and producer for CNN for 14 years, and was a producer on the channel's environmental program Earth Matters. As a segment producer for TBS's Network Earth, she was nominated for a 1992 CableACE Award for magazine show special or series, and received an Environmental Media Award for TV News Magazine Segment as correspondent and writer for the series in 1996.

Books
Skiff started working on her first book, God Stories: Inspiring Encounters With the Divine, after what she described as a miraculous recovery from bone marrow cancer at the age of 32. It was published by Random House in 2008 and includes 100 stories of encounters with God, which she collected from people of various faiths, backgrounds and nationalities. Publishers Weekly called it "mysterious and faith-inspiring" and "inspiring if uneven". It was excerpted on Today.com.

Her second book, The Divinity of Dogs: True Stories of Miracles Inspired by Man's Best Friend, was published by Simon & Schuster on October 23, 2012. The book is a compilation of inspirational stories about dogs gathered from people's submissions. It reached number 8 on the Toronto Star nonfiction bestseller list in April 2015. The Divinity of Dogs was based on submissions Skiff received when writing God Stories. Starting in 2010, she spent over a year collecting submissions, photos, and interviews. The stories are told from the point of view of the dog owners. The book has a musical companion, The Divinity of Dogs: Music to Calm Dogs and the People Who Love Them, created by Skiff and pianist George Skaroulis.

Skiff's third book, Rescuing Ladybugs: Inspirational Encounters with Animals That Changed the World, published by New World Library in 2018, highlights the true stories of remarkable people who didn't look away from seemingly impossible to change situations, and describes how their lives have been enriched while they've worked to save animals. Leaders in what Skiff calls the "Compassion Movement", their stories illustrate how we can break barriers to improve all life on earth.

From Rescuing Ladybugs: "There's an honorable war being fought in our world for animals.  In it, the good are going after the evil, the generous are taking aim at the greedy, and the kind are blanketing the cruel.  I refer to it as the compassion movement because it's fueled by a desire to alleviate suffering."

In the book, Skiff says that in 2018 "there are more laws and corporate policies protecting farm animals than ever before, and more consumers are leaving animals off their plates and eating plant-based meals instead.  This colossal shift is due to Josh Balk and other leaders in the compassion movement who confront cruelty head-on, using common sense and innovation."

In the book, Skiff says "There are many leaders in the compassion movement — too many to profile in one book. These are the people we admire for their ability to see the roots of problems and develop effective strategies for fixing them, as well as for their courage to combat greed when it inevitably clashes with compassion. They are the visionaries, pacesetters, and analytical thinkers whose unexpected connections with animals are driving sweeping change throughout the world."

In the book, Skiff notes Jill Robinson, co-founder of Animals Asia as "leading the compassion movement on the largest continent on earth – Asia."

Dr Michael W Fox, veterinarian and author on Rescuing Ladybugs: "Rescuing Ladybugs is an exceptional book - a clarion call to awaken our empathy, ignite compassionate action, and help recover our humanity in these dystopian times. It should be required reading."

Animal Advocacy
Skiff co-authored the position paper that led to West Australian Parliament passing sweeping laws to end puppy farming that included, mandatory spay/neuter of dogs before the age of two-years-old, mandatory dog breeder registration, a centralized government dog registration system, and the transitioning of pet shops into adoption centers.

Professional associations
 Animal Wellness Action, Director of International Programs
 Humane Society of the United States, Chair, Maine State Council
SPCA of Hancock County: Chair, SPCAHC Trustee Council
 Animal Aid USA, Adviser
 Institute for Humane Education, Adviser
 Dogs' Refuge Home WA, Australia, Trustee

Bibliography
 God Stories: Inspiring Encounters With the Divine (Penguin Random House / Harmony Books, 2008)
 The Divinity of Dogs: True Stories of Miracles Inspired by Man's Best Friend (Simon & Schuster / Atria Books, 2012)
Rescuing Ladybugs:  Inspirational Encounters with Animals That Changed the World (New World Library, 2018)

Personal life
Skiff splits her time living between Maine, USA, and Perth, Western Australia. She is a trustee of the Dogs' Refuge Home, a no-kill shelter in Australia, and also works with other charities to help abused and abandoned animals.

Skiff was featured in the book, One Hundred & One Reasons to Get Out of Bed:  Small World Steps, Big Planet Heroes by Barbara Royal and Natasha Milne.

References

External links
 Official website

1961 births
Living people
21st-century American women writers
Television producers from Massachusetts
American animal welfare scholars
New Age writers
People from Bar Harbor, Maine
Texas Christian University alumni
Writers from Boston
Writers from Maine
Writers from Perth, Western Australia
American women television producers